Royal Leamington Spa, commonly known as Leamington Spa or simply Leamington, is a spa town and civil parish in Warwickshire, England. Originally a small village called Leamington Priors, it grew into a spa town in the 18th century following the popularisation of its water which was reputed to have medicinal qualities. In the 19th century, the town experienced one of the most rapid expansions in England. It is named after the River Leam, which flows through the town.

The town contains especially fine ensembles of Regency architecture, particularly in parts of the Parade, Clarendon Square and Lansdowne Circus.

In the 2021 census Leamington had a population of 50,923. Leamington is adjoined with the neighbouring towns of Warwick and Whitnash, and the village of Cubbington; together these form a conurbation known as the "Royal Leamington Spa Built-up area" which in 2011 had a population of 95,172.

History

Formerly a small village known as Leamington Priors, Leamington began to develop as a town at the start of the 19th century. It was first mentioned in the Domesday Book of 1086 as Lamintone. For 400 years, the settlement was under the control of Kenilworth Priory, from which the older suffix derived. Its name came from Anglo-Saxon Leman-tūn or Lemen-tūn = "farm on the River Leam". The spa waters had been known in Roman times, and their rediscovery in 1784 by William Abbotts and Benjamin Satchwell led to their commercialisation, with invalids beginning to resort here in 1786. Six of the seven wells were drilled for; only the original spring at the site of the Aylesford Well, adjacent to the Parish Church, occurred naturally.

The old village of Leamington Priors was on the southern bank of the River Leam, and early development was based around this. During the early 19th century, developers began concentrating the town's expansion on the land north of the river. This resulted in the Georgian centre of New Town with the Leam flowing between the two. By 1810, the town's existing bath houses could not cope with the increasing visitor numbers, and a syndicate was formed to build a new bath house north of the River Leam. A new saline spring was found on land close to the river, belonging to Bertie Greatheed, a wealthy plantation owner and landowner from Guys Cliffe, and a member of the syndicate. In 1814, the Royal Pump Rooms and Baths were opened on the site, designed by C.S. Smith, who also designed The Regent Hotel and the Upper Assembly Rooms in the town. Spa water can still be sampled outside the building.

Leamington became a popular spa resort attracting the wealthy and famous, with numerous Georgian townhouses to accommodate visitors. Construction of what is now the Parade began in sections from 1808, the Regent Hotel in 1818, a town hall in 1830. and the Jephson Gardens in 1834.  In 1838 Queen Victoria granted the town a 'Royal' prefix, and 'Leamington Priors' was renamed 'Royal Leamington Spa'. Queen Victoria had visited the town as a Princess in 1830 and as Queen in 1858. In 1840 the Victoria Bridge was opened, connecting the old and new towns, replacing an old, narrow, and inconvenient bridge.

The growth of Leamington was rapid; at the time of the first national census in 1801, Leamington had a population of just 315, by 1851 this had grown to 15,724, and by 1901, the population had reached 26,888.

The London and North Western Railway opened the first railway line into Leamington; a  branch line from Coventry in 1844, followed by a branch to Rugby in 1851. In 1852 the Great Western Railway's main line between Birmingham, Oxford and London opened through Leamington, upon which the first railway station at the current location was opened.

As the popularity of spa resorts declined towards the end of the 19th century, the focus of Leamington's economy shifted towards becoming a popular place of residence for retired people and for members of the middle class, many of whom relocated from Coventry and Birmingham. Its well off residents led to the development of Leamington as a popular place for shopping. 

In 1832 the town's main hospital, Warneford Hospital, opened, named after philanthropist Samuel Wilson Warneford. At first a semi-private affair it was taken over by the National Health Service after the Second World War, before succumbing to budget cuts and closing in 1993.

Leamington is closely associated with the founding of lawn tennis. The first tennis club in the world was formed in 1872 by Major Henry Gem and Augurio Pereira who had started playing tennis in the garden of Pereira. It was located just behind the former Manor House Hotel and the modern rules of lawn tennis were drawn up in 1874 in Leamington Tennis Club.

During the Second World War, Leamington was bombed a number of times during The Blitz, although this caused substantial damage it caused relatively few casualties. The town was also home to the Free Czechoslovak Army; a memorial in the Jephson Gardens commemorates the bravery of Czechoslovak parachutists from Warwickshire.

Geography

Leamington is divided by the River Leam running east to west, which is susceptible to flooding in extreme weather, with especially heavy floods in 1998 and 2007.

The Leam is a tributary of the River Avon, which it joins just to the west of Leamington. The ancient town of Warwick lies adjoined directly to the west of Leamington, on the opposite bank of the Avon. Also contiguous with Leamington, directly to the south, with no natural border, is the smaller town of Whitnash. The village of Cubbington is adjoined to the north-east. Just outside the town lie the villages of Old Milverton to the north and Radford Semele  to the east.

Leamington has several suburbs; the town has encompassed the former village of Lillington, directly to the north of the town centre. Other suburbs include Milverton to the northwest, Campion Hills to the east, Sydenham to the east and the rapidly expanding Heathcote district to the southwest.

The main road running through the town centre is Parade (formerly Lillington Lane until 1860). This shopping street contains high street chains and The Royal Priors shopping mall.

Governance

Leamington Spa is a town and civil parish in the Warwick District, an administrative division of the county of Warwickshire. Between 1875 and 1974 Leamington was a municipal borough. As part of the 1974 local government reform it was merged with Warwick, Kenilworth and Whitnash, and surrounding rural areas into the Warwick District, which has its offices in Leamington. In 2002 Leamington Spa became a civil parish and gained a new Town Council.

Leamington is part of the parliamentary constituency of Warwick and Leamington. From the 1997 general election until the 2010 general election the constituency was represented in parliament by James Plaskitt of the Labour Party; until then this had been a Conservative safe seat, counting former British prime minister Anthony Eden among its Members of Parliament (MPs). The seat became highly marginal at the 2005 general election, where James Plaskitt won with a majority of just 266 votes. In the 2010 general election the seat returned to the Conservative Party, with Chris White winning the seat by 3,513 votes. White remained the MP until the 2017 general election, when the seat was won by Matt Western of the Labour Party, which he retained at the 2019 general election with his majority reduced from 1,206 to 789.

Notable buildings

Buildings in the town include a variety of Georgian and early Victorian architecture, and listed buildings such as the Grade II listed Lansdowne Crescent in neo-classical style, designed by William Thomas between 1835 and 1838.

Amongst the Anglican churches in Leamington is the Gothic parish church All Saints' Church, and St John the Baptist's Church. 

St Mark's Church on Rugby Road was designed by George Gilbert Scott Jr. in 1879. It is a Gothic revival design, in red brick with stone dressings. It was endowed by the Carus-Wilson family, in memory of Frances Carus-Wilson (d.1872), wife of Sir Trevor Wheler.

There is a Roman Catholic church, St Peter's Church, two United Reformed churches (one being in Lillington), a small mosque and a Hindu temple. In 2009, the Sikh community built the Gurdwara Sahib Leamington and Warwick in Warwick which also serves Leamington. There are also Christadelphian and Jehovah's Witnesses meeting halls in the town.

Eden Court in Lillington is a residential tower block and one of several tall landmarks. In December 2010, the Warwickshire Justice Centre was completed in Newbold Terrace. As well as a police station, the complex houses a magistrates' court, and the Crown Court, County Court, and other agencies such as the Probation Service and Victim Support. It was officially opened by Queen Elizabeth II on 4 March 2011.

An oak tree just to the northeast of the town centre is marked by a plaque stating that it commemorates the Midland Oak, a tree that grew near the spot and was reputed to be at the centre of England.

Demography
At the 2011 census, there were 49,491 residents in Leamington in 22,098 households, and the median age of Leamington residents was 34. In terms of ethnicity:

86% of Leamington residents were White (Comprising 77.2% White British, 6.7% Other White, and 2.1% Irish). 
9.2% were Asian (Comprising 6.4% Indian, 0.8% Chinese, 0.5% Pakistani, 0.1% Bangladeshi and 0.8% from another Asian background)
1.1% were Black (Comprising 0.5% African, 0.5% Caribbean and 0.1% other Black)
2.7% were Mixed. 
0.2% were Arab, and 0.9% were from another ethnic group.

In terms of religion, 51.5% of Leamington residents identified as Christian, 32.1% said they had no religion, 7.5% did not state any religion, 5.1% were Sikh, 1.5% were Hindu, 1.3% were Muslim, 0.4% were Buddhists, 0.3% were Jewish and 0.5% were from another religion.

Economy

Tourism
The popularity of the town's waters in the 19th century led to the town's initial growth, making tourism Leamington's primary industry in the 19th century.

Retail
In the town centre there are a variety of shops from high street chains to independent retailers, plus an indoor shopping centre, The Royal Priors. There is an out of town retail park called the Leamington Shopping Park (formerly The Shires Retail Park), even though it sits within the boundaries of Warwick. It opened in 1989.

Manufacturing
Tourism was initially driven by the spring waters. The arrival of the Warwick and Napton Canal (later amalgamated into the Grand Union Canal) officially opened in 1799 as the primary means of cargo transport and led to growth in other industries until rail gradually took over in the mid 19th century, The canal supplied coal to the gasworks on Tachbrook Road, providing gas to light the town from 1835. Pig iron, coke and limestone were delivered by canal, allowing a number of foundries to be established in Leamington, specialising in cast iron stoves. Today the Eagle Foundry, dating from at least 1851, continues to manufacture Rangemaster Aga stoves. The Imperial Foundry, dating from around 1925, was subsequently taken over by Ford, casting engine blocks until its closure in 2008.

The prominent car parts manufacturer Automotive Products based in the south of the town grew from a small garage to occupy a large site. Throughout the 20th century, while tourism took a downturn, Automotive Products expanded and built a factory in the South of the town in 1928 that is still operative in 2009, although on a much smaller scale. Karobes Limited, with its headquarters in Queensway, was one of Britain's major suppliers of accessories for cars between World War II and the 1970s.

Commercial parks for service providers and light industry and offices are primarily located to the south of the town: Althorpe Street Industrial Estate, Queensway Trading Estate, Shires Gate Trading Estate and Sydenham Industrial Estate.

In June 2014, Detroit Electric announced that they would be building their SP.01 all-electric roadster in Leamington Spa.

Digital media and the video game industry
Leamington Spa and the surrounding area, known as Silicon Spa, is a significant global centre for the video game industry, with a higher than average proportion of digital media companies involved in games development, digital design and publishing, and over a thousand employed directly in game development. Companies based in or around the town include Third Kind Games, Super Spline Studios, Lab42, Sumo Leamington, Caperfly, Widgit Software, DNA Interactive, Fish in a Bottle, Ubisoft Leamington, Unit 2, Electric Square, Full Fat, Kwalee, Pixel Toys, Playground Games, Red Chain Games, Stickman Studios, Supersonic Software and Midoki. Codemasters are based at Southam near Leamington and were the initial impetus behind the cluster, providing many of the staff for the companies in Leamington. In 2013, Sega's mobile platform studio Hardlight Studio set up in Leamington, and Exient opened a satellite studio.
Former companies were Blitz Games Studios, FreeStyleGames, Bigbig Studios and Titus Software UK Limited.

Healthcare
Local hospitals include the  Leamington Spa Hospital and the Warwickshire Nuffield Hospital. On 13 July 2021 a coronavirus "mega lab" was opened in the town. Named after English chemist Rosalind Franklin, the laboratory is intended to be capable of processing hundreds of thousands of samples a day, making it the largest of its kind in the UK. It is expected to create up to 1,500 jobs.

Education
There are a number of schools either located within Leamington, or which include Leamington in their priority (catchment) area.  Those within Leamington include the state secondary schools of North Leamington School, Campion School, Trinity Catholic School, and the independent schools of Arnold Lodge School, a co-educational school for pupils aged 3 to 18, and Kingsley School, a school for girls.  Myton School in Warwick, although located just outside Leamington, includes parts of Leamington as being within its priority area.

As well as these schools, Leamington children can attend Stratford-upon-Avon Grammar School for Girls, a state run selective school, Warwick School, an independent school for boys, the King's High School for Girls, Warwick's twin school and Princethorpe College, a mixed independent school in the nearby village of Princethorpe.

Leamington is the location of the first of Warwickshire College's six sites, and additionally another site is located just outside the town. The closest higher education institutions are the University of Warwick, in southwestern Coventry, and Coventry University.

Leamington is also home to two national educational charities – The Smallpeice Trust and The Arkwright Scholarships Trust. They specialise in making young people aware of how STEM fields studied in school can lead to fulfilling and exciting careers in science and engineering sectors of industry.

Culture

Leamington Spa Art Gallery & Museum 
Leamington Spa Art Gallery & Museum is located in the Royal Pump Rooms, on the Parade. It holds a collection of over 12,000 objects, including fine and decorative arts, as well as items relating to local and social history.  It provides exhibitions in the visual arts and about the history of the town, supported by workshops, talks and other events.

Community centres 
There are several local community centres.

Peace Festival
Since 1978, the annual free festival and celebration of alternative culture called the Peace Festival has been held in the Pump Room Gardens, however the event was cancelled due to the COVID-19 pandemic and not been held since 2019.

Music
Live music is provided by local bands in a variety of venues. In December 2005 the band Nizlopi from Leamington, reached Number 1 in the UK Singles Chart with The JCB Song. The Woodbine Street Recording Studios has been used by several well-known music acts such as local band The Shapes, whose single "Batman in the Launderette" charted first in 1979, Paul Weller, Ocean Colour Scene, Felt and The Specials. Classical music concerts are organised throughout the year in the Leamington and Warwick area, including the International String Quartet series at the Royal Pump Rooms. The Assembly, is a 1,000 capacity music venue attracting national and international artists, and was awarded 'Live Music Venue of the Year' at the 2010 Music Week Awards. and the Leamington Spa Competitive Festival for Music Dance and Drama is staged annually.

Theatre and cinema
Two theatres are located in Leamington: the Spa Centre and the amateur The Loft, with outdoor summer productions in Jephson Gardens. Leamington also has two cinemas: the Spa Centre and a multiplex.

Sport and leisure
There are a number of sports clubs and leisure facilities in Leamington Spa, including the oldest purpose built Real Tennis court in the world at Leamington Tennis Court Club, the football club Leamington F.C., a disc golf course Quarry Park, a leisure centre including swimming pool Newbold Comyn Leisure Centre, rugby grounds Leamington Rugby Union Football Club, Leamington Rugby Club – Youth Section and Old Leamingtonians Rugby Football Club, Leamington Cricket, Khalsa Leamington Hockey Club, Leamington Cycling club, Leamington Athletics club, Spa Striders Running Club, Royal Leamington Spa Canoe Club, Leamington Chess Club, formed in 1851, and municipal tennis courts.
The Royal Leamington Spa Bowling Club in Victoria Park hosts the annual National Lawn Bowls Championships.

Parks and gardens
The town has several parks and gardens, including the Jephson Gardens, close to the Royal Pump Rooms and next to the River Leam. These were seriously damaged in the floods of 1998, but have been restored and improved with funding from the National Lottery. The other side of the River Leam, on Priory Terrace features the "Elephant Walk" 19th-century slipway down to the river located near the suspension bridge in Jephson Gardens. It was specifically constructed so that circus elephants in winter quarters in Leamington could be watered. Other parks are the Mill Gardens on the opposite bank of the river to Jephson Gardens, Victoria Park, the Royal Pump Room Gardens, The Dell and Newbold Comyn which includes the nature reserves Welches Meadow and Leam Valley.

Popular culture
The cover of the Ocean Colour Scene album Moseley Shoals features the Jephson Memorial in Jephson Gardens. The town has been used as a filming location in various television series. BBC's Upstairs Downstairs used the Georgian terrace at Clarendon Square as a main exterior location.  ITV's Sherlock Holmes episode 'The Last Vampyre' featured Guy's Cliffe House, which was severely damaged in a fire during production. Leamington also appeared as a location in ChuckleVision, and Keeping Up Appearances.

Transport

Road
It is also served by the A46, which links it to Coventry and Stratford-upon-Avon

Rail

Leamington Spa railway station is served by the Chiltern Main Line, which links London Marylebone to Birmingham Snow Hill and onwards to Kidderminster. Fast train services on this route are operated by Chiltern Railways. Chiltern Railways also run trains via Warwick to Stratford-upon-Avon. West Midlands Trains operate local services to Birmingham and onwards to Worcester Shrub Hill.

Bus and coach 
Regular bus services to Kenilworth, the University of Warwick and Coventry are operated by Stagecoach in Warwickshire and National Express Coventry. Services to Warwick, Banbury, Stratford-upon-Avon and Rugby are operated by Stagecoach in Warwickshire and by other independent companies. Coaches to locations nationally and internationally are available.

Air 
Leamington's nearest international passenger airport is Birmingham Airport. 
Coventry Airport is a nearby general aviation airport and former tourist charter hub. It currently (2018) has no scheduled passenger services.

Waterways 
The Grand Union Canal is used for recreation. This crosses the River Avon between Leamington and Warwick, and then passes the town to the south, parallel to the River Leam to the north. The rivers are not used for transportation, but there are proposals to render them navigable.

Cycleways 
There are national and local cycleways into and around Leamington.

Trams 
Between 1881 and 1930, Leamington & Warwick Tramways & Omnibus Company operated trams between the two towns.

Notable residents

Famous people who were born in Leamington include the world champion boxer Randolph Turpin (1928–1966), the poet, mountaineer, magician, and occultist Aleister Crowley (1875–1947), the pathologist Sir Bernard Spilsbury (1877–1947), the artist Sir Terry Frost (1915-2003), the actor, broadcaster and writer Norman Painting (1924–2009), and professional footballer Ben Foster.

Other famous people to live or have lived in Leamington include the inventor of the jet engine Frank Whittle (1907–1996) who lived in Leamington as a child, the television presenter Anne Diamond, the comedian Russell Howard. Grime artist Stormzy lived in Leamington while studying for an apprenticeship.

Twin towns – sister cities

Royal Leamington Spa is twinned with:
 Sceaux, France (since 1969)
 Brühl, North Rhine-Westphalia, Germany (since 1973)
 Heemstede, Netherlands (since 1987)

Friendship
Royal Leamington Spa has friendship agreements with:
 Leamington, Canada – which was named after Royal Leamington Spa
 Bo, Sierra Leone

Climate
Leamington Spa experiences the oceanic climate which covers most of the United Kingdom.

See also

List of spa towns in the United Kingdom
Listed buildings in Warwickshire

References

Further reading

 Storrie, Janet (1990) Elephants in Royal Leamington Spa Weir Books ,

External links

Royal Leamington Spa Town Council

 
Towns in Warwickshire
Spa towns in England
Places with royal patronage in England
Civil parishes in Warwickshire
Warwick District